"Dirty Girl" is a song recorded by Canadian country music artist Terri Clark. It was released in July 2007 as the first single from her unreleased album, My Next Life.  It reached number 30 on the Billboard Hot Country Songs chart in the United States.

The song was written by Tom Shapiro and Rivers Rutherford and intended to be performed by a man. Clark reworked the song to be performed from a female perspective.

Chart performance

References

2007 singles
2007 songs
Terri Clark songs
Songs written by Rivers Rutherford
Songs written by Tom Shapiro
Song recordings produced by Garth Fundis
BNA Records singles